Henderson is a crater on the far side of the Moon. It is located to the east of the huge walled plain Mendeleev. This is a worn crater with a shallow rim. No significant craters overlie the rim or interior, but a smaller, worn crater is attached to the southern outer rim. A ridge of material runs from the northwest rim to the midpoint of the floor. Henderson lies within the eroded remains of a larger and older crater-like feature.

Satellite craters
By convention these features are identified on lunar maps by placing the letter on the side of the crater midpoint that is closest to Henderson.

References

 
 
 
 
 
 
 
 
 
 
 
 

Impact craters on the Moon